Alexa Glatch was the defending champion, but chose not to participate.

Madison Brengle won the title, defeating Lara Arruabarrena in the final, 4–6, 6–4, 6–3.

Seeds

Main draw

Finals

Top half

Bottom half

References 
 Main draw

Wilde Lexus Women's USTA Pro Circuit Event - Singles